Bhugaon is a village in Pune, India that is located in the outskirts of the city. Despite it being located in the outskirts, it is a wild green corridor contiguously connected to the heart of PUNE, erandwane where the Sahyadri Mountains extend, a tunnel cut road interruption of forest by Chandani Chowk, Pune. In recent years, Bhugaon has seen rapid urbanization due to the booming IT sector in Pune.

There are 120 adivasis who attend Bhugaon Gram Panchayat meetings and are making a FRA Act 2006 Community Forest Rights dawah to the Hanuman-Ferguson College Tekdi FRC

https://indianexpress.com/article/cities/pune/to-get-clearance-for-projects-on-forest-land-pmc-to-set-up-frc-6199219/

References

Villages in Pune district